Mandsaur Lok Sabha constituency is one of the 29 Lok Sabha constituencies in the Indian state of Madhya Pradesh. This constituency covers the entire Mandsaur and Neemuch districts and part of Ratlam district.

Assembly segments
Presently, Mandsour Lok Sabha constituency comprises the following eight Vidhan Sabha (Legislative Assembly) segments:

Members of Parliament

Election results

General Elections 2019

General Elections 2014

General Elections 2009

References

See also
 Mandsaur district
 Neemuch district
 List of Constituencies of the Lok Sabha

Lok Sabha constituencies in Madhya Pradesh
Mandsaur district
Neemuch district